Robert Jungk (born Robert Baum, also known as Robert Baum-Jungk; 11 May 1913 – 14 July 1994) was an Austrian writer, journalist, historian and peace campaigner who wrote mostly on issues relating to nuclear weapons.

Life
Jungk was born into a Jewish family in Berlin. His father, known as Max Jungk, was born David Baum (1872, Miskovice – 1937, Prague). When Adolf Hitler came to power, Jungk was arrested and released, moved to Paris, then back to Nazi Germany to work in a subversive press service. These activities forced him to move through various cities, such as Prague, Paris, and Zurich, during World War II. He continued journalism after the war.

His book, Brighter than a Thousand Suns: A Personal History of the Atomic Scientists, was the first published account of the Manhattan Project and the German atomic bomb project, and its first Danish edition included a passage which implied that the German project had been purposely dissuaded from developing a weapon by Werner Heisenberg and his associates (a claim strongly contested by Niels Bohr), and led to a series of questions over a 1941 meeting between Bohr and Heisenberg in Copenhagen, Denmark, which was later the basis for Michael Frayn's 1998 play, Copenhagen.

In 1986, he received the Right Livelihood Award for "struggling indefatigably on behalf of peace, sane alternatives for the future and ecological awareness."

In 1992, he made an unsuccessful bid for the Austrian presidency on behalf of the Green Party.

Jungk died in Salzburg on 14 July 1994.

Bibliography 
 Tomorrow Is Already Here, New York: Simon & Schuster, 1954. Reportage on scientific and technical breakthroughs, a work of nascent dystopian 'futurism'. Much of it was about what developed from the Manhattan Project, as well as things like "electronic brains".
 Brighter than a Thousand Suns: A Personal History of the Atomic Scientists, New York: Harcourt Brace, 1958
 Children of the Ashes, 1st English ed. 1961. About Hiroshima
 The Nuclear State
 The Everyman Project
 Future Workshops

Decorations and awards
 1970: Honorary Professor at the Technical University of Berlin
 1986: Right Livelihood Award
 1989: Honorary Citizen of the City of Salzburg
 1992: Alternative Büchner Prize
 1993: Honorary Doctor of the University of Osnabrück
 1993: Austrian Cross of Honour for Science and Art
 1993: Salzburg Award for Future Research

See also
 Alexander Sachs (Robert Jungk about the 1939 Szilard–Einstein letter to President Franklin Roosevelt)

Notes

External links 
 "Robert Jungk, futurist and social inventor"
 
 Zukunftswerkstatt
 Robert Jungk & The New Encyclopedists (1978) revisited – a late eulogy at the 14th Anniversary of his death

1913 births
1994 deaths
Journalists from Berlin
Futurologists
Sustainability advocates
Austrian anti–nuclear power activists
Austrian Jews
Austrian people of German descent
Writers from Salzburg
The Greens – The Green Alternative politicians
Recipients of the Austrian Cross of Honour for Science and Art
Candidates for President of Austria
20th-century Austrian writers
20th-century Austrian male writers
20th-century Austrian journalists
Politicians from Salzburg